A dance party (also referred to as a dance) is a social gathering where dancing is the primary activity. Some dance parties are held in a casual setting and open to the public, such as a rave, or those held in nightclubs.

Other types of dance parties may be a formal or semi-formal private event which often require guests to don formal wear and have an invitation or membership within the community hosting the event, such as school dances and cotillions.

Guests of formal dances often attend in pairs, as consorts or "dates" for one another. The term "stag" refers to going without a consort to a dance organized for couples. Dances commonly take place during the evening, although some are held earlier during the daytime; such events are known as tea dances.

Dances are a way of expressing emotions, etc.

Casual dances
Casual dances are dances that do not have a formal dress requirement; these may include school and community events, raves, evening entertainments provided for guests aboard a cruise ship, and events organized for certain holidays, such as Halloween and Mardis Gras.

School dances

A school dance is a dance sponsored by a school, and may be casual or formal. Casual school dances were originally limited to Western countries, although schools in other countries are beginning to adopt such events. There are some schools, such as Arlington High School in Arlington, Massachusetts, that prohibit school-hosted dances, citing sex and alcohol problems.

In the United States

One of the most significant school dances is prom, a relatively formal event normally reserved for Junior grade and Senior grade students. Some schools host a winter formal, a similar event, for the lower grades. In the 1950s, informal school dances in the United States were often called sock hops. The traditional Sadie Hawkins dance may be formal or semi-formal.

Formal dances

One type of formal dance, known as a ball, is a dance event where guests dress formally. In Western culture, a male may don white tie and a female may don a ball gown. Dinner dances are formal dances where dinner is served. Often, the style of music played at a ball is most suited to ballroom dancing.

Popularity

In Australia, dance parties are popular amongst teenagers, to the point that many dance parties are held specifically for teenagers in nightclubs or other locations which allow underage guests, who are usually unable to attend such places due to local laws.

Ambience

Dance parties are usually held at night, and may be hosted in private homes, bars, gymnasiums, nightclubs, community centers, ballrooms, or other large open spaces suitable for use as a dance floor by many people simultaneously.

The music at dance parties is usually played through a PA system or a more powerful sound system, and is often supplied by a DJ who selects and plays pre-recorded songs from vinyl records, compact discs or with a laptop; however, some dance parties feature live instrumentalists or musicians playing their music live on an instrument, or with a laptop. Raves and other large, modern dance parties use visual and lighting effects, such as strobe lighting and smoke machines.

Cultural milestones
In the Jewish community, Bar and Bat Mitzvah celebrations often involve dances.

Dances are common for Quinceañeras, sweet sixteen parties and débutante celebrations. Some of these coming of age events involve a father-daughter dance.

At wedding receptions, the newlywed couple may opt to have a first dance (before all guests are invited to participate on the dance floor).

A dance party that is gaining popularity is the Bollywood dance party, featuring music from Hindi cinema from India. A popular dance party that demonstrates this style of music and dance combination is produced by Wicked Karma  that is produced by Christie Sanam and DJ RDX 

Nurai, a nightclub in Beirut hosted a party event on the 28th August 2017 and by August 30, 2017 it broke the Guinness World Record for hosting a 56-hour long party to show that "it is the best party city in the world!"

Specialized events
Some dance events may put an emphasis on certain genres of dance. For example, an event may feature swing or square dancing rather than dancing in general.  A masked ball is a type of costume party that features dancing. Dance parties at which people mainly dance Tango are called Milongas.

See also

Dance hall
Play party (United States)
Social dance
Dance music
:Category:Dance festivals
:Category:Partner dance

References

Party
Parties
Social dance